The Bishop of Maidstone is an episcopal title used by a suffragan bishop of the Church of England Diocese of Canterbury, in the Province of Canterbury, England. The title takes its name after the county town of Maidstone in Kent.

Canterbury suffragan
Until 2009, the suffragan Bishop of Maidstone had a similar, though subordinate, role to that of the Bishop of Dover: to assist the diocesan bishop (the Archbishop of Canterbury) in the episcopal leadership of the Diocese of Canterbury. It was decided at the diocesan synod of November 2010 that a new bishop would not be appointed; rather the Archdeaconry of Ashford was erected.

"Headship" bishop
On 4 December 2014, it was announced that the see of Maidstone would be filled again in order to provide alternative episcopal oversight for particular members of the Church of England who take a conservative evangelical view on male "headship". On 23 September 2015, Rod Thomas was consecrated Bishop of Maidstone.

In June 2022, it was announced that, from January 2023, oversight of conservative Catholics in the west of the Province of Canterbury (formerly the Bishop of Ebbsfleet's area) would be taken by a new Bishop of Oswestry, suffragan to the Bishop of Lichfield; while oversight of conservative Evangelicals would be taken by the next Bishop of Ebbsfleet; the See of Maidstone would be left vacant, available for other uses.

List of bishops

See also

References

External links
 Crockford's Clerical Directory - Listings

 
Maidstone